Dead Infection was a Polish goregrind band, that was founded in 1990 by Cyjan, and Domin (ex members of grindcore band Front Terror). Since their formation, the band has released a few full-length albums, and 7-inch EPs. They are the second band from Poland after Vader that made a deal to release a CD/LP with a non-European label. Their second album, A Chapter Of Accidents, is considered by many to be among the milestones of goregrind music. They played numerous live shows around the world, including all of Europe, the United States, South America, Mexico, Japan. In February 2020, Cyjan died, which led to the group's disbandment.

Members
 Current line-up
Cyjan - drums (1990-2020; died 2020)
Pierścień - guitar, vocals (2005-2020)
Bielemuk - guitar (2019-2020)

Former members
Domin - guitar, vocals (1990)
Kelner - bass, guitar, vocals (1990-1991, 1992-1994)
Mały - guitar (1990-1999)
Tocha - guitar (1991-2006)
Gołąb - bass, vocals (1991-1992)
Jaro - vocals (1994-2006)
Huzar - guitar (2003)
Hal - bass, vocals (2006-2011)
Lis - bass (2011-2012)
Yaro - bass (2014-2015)
Vertherry - bass (2016-2018)

Timeline

Discography

Studio albums
1993: Surgical Disembowelment (CD/LP) / 2010: (re-edition LP)
1995: A Chapter of Accidents (CD) / 2011: (LP)
2004: Brain Corrosion (CD) / 2006: (LP)

7" EPs
1994: Party's Over (Split with Blood)
1998: No Pate, No Mind (Split with Malignant Tumour)
1998: Poppy-Seed Cake (Split with Clotted Symmetric Sexual Organ)
2009: Heartburn Result (Split with Regurgitate)
2009: Furniture Obsession (Split with Haemorrhage)
2014: Looking For Victims (Split with Parricide)

Other releases
1991: World Full of Remains (Demo) / 2006: (LP edition)
1992: Start Human Slaughter (Demo) / 2006: (LP edition)
1997: Human Slaughter.. till Remains (CD compilation of demos)
1998: The Greatest Shits (Tribute MCD)
2008: Corpses of The Universe (MCD) / 2009: (LP)
2008: Dead Singles Collection (CD compilation of 7-inch EPs)

External links
Dead Infection at Facebook

Polish death metal musical groups
Grindcore musical groups
Polish heavy metal musical groups
Polish musical groups
Musical groups established in 1990
Polish musical trios